Hayes Mill House is a historic home located in Newlin Township, Chester County, Pennsylvania. It is located nearly opposite the Star Gazers' Stone.  It was built about 1780, and is a two-story, three bay, single pile stone dwelling with a gable roof.  It has a two-story frame wing.  The main section features a corbeled stone cornice.

It was added to the National Register of Historic Places in 1985.

References

Houses on the National Register of Historic Places in Pennsylvania
Houses completed in 1780
Houses in Chester County, Pennsylvania
Historic districts on the National Register of Historic Places in Pennsylvania
National Register of Historic Places in Chester County, Pennsylvania